FOSS is a global provider of high-tech analytical solutions used mainly in the agricultural and food industries. The company is headquartered in Hillerød, Denmark.

History
FOSS was founded by Nils Foss in 1956, as N. Foss Electric A/S. The first products were instruments used in the testing of moisture in grain. They were followed by analytical solutions for the dairy industry. In 1997, FOSS acquired Perstorp Analytical AB with the subsidiaries Tecator AB and NIRSystems Inc.

Nils Foss was CEO of the company until 1990, when the position was taken over by his son Peter Foss. In 2011, Torben Ladegaard was appointed to CEO while Peter Foss became chairman of the company. Ladegaard  was succeeded by Kim Vejlby Hansen as CEO in 2016.

Operations
FOSS is headquartered in Hillerød where a new Foss Innovation Centre  was inaugurated in 2014. The company has approximately 1,400 Employees and sales offices in 28 countries.

References

External links
 *

Technology companies of Denmark
Technology companies based in Copenhagen
Companies based in Hillerød Municipality
Danish companies established in 1956
Technology companies established in 1956